Francis Michael Winkler is a former American football defensive end for the National Football League (NFL). He was drafted by the Green Bay Packers in the fifth round of the 1968 NFL Draft and played two seasons with the team.

References

People from Memphis, Tennessee
Green Bay Packers players
American football defensive ends
Memphis Tigers football players
1946 births
Living people